Emily Buss is a lawyer and law professor. She is Mark and Barbara Fried Professor of Law at the University of Chicago Law School. Her research focuses on child and parental rights.

Education
Buss attended Yale University for college, graduating summa cum laude in 1982, and law school, earning a JD in 1986.

Career
Buss clerked for United States Supreme Court Justice Harry Blackmun. She worked at the Juvenile Law Center in Philadelphia, Pennsylvania from 1990 to 1996 when she joined the University of Chicago Law School faculty. In 2007, she was promoted to Mark and Barbara Fried Professor of Law. 

Buss’s research focuses on child and parental rights, as well as the distribution of responsibility for child development among parents, the state and the child. She is the author of From Foster Care to Adulthood: The University of Chicago Law School Foster Care Project's Protocol for Reform and the co-editor, with Mavis Maclean, of The Law and Child Development (Ashgate, 2010).

Publications

Books

Edited collections

Articles

See also 
 List of law clerks of the Supreme Court of the United States (Seat 2)

References

Living people
Yale College alumni
Yale Law School alumni
University of Chicago Law School faculty
20th-century American women lawyers
20th-century American lawyers
Scholars of childhood
Family law scholars
American women legal scholars
American legal scholars
Year of birth missing (living people)
21st-century American women lawyers
21st-century American lawyers